Jaa9 & OnklP is a Norwegian rapping duo made up of Jaa9 (real name Johnny Engdal Silseth) and OnklP (real name Pål Tøien). Both are members of the Norwegian rap collective Dirty Oppland.

The duo were discovered by Poppa Lars (real name Lars Sandness) and "Jørg-1" (real name Jørgen Nordeng) in Tungtvann and invited them to in the autumn of 2002 to participate in a track on their Feast EP. The duo has released several music albums jointly. In October 2003, Jaa9 & OnklP released the album, Bondegramatikk – the Mixtape, a collection of old and new tracks, put together by Poppa Lars and DJ Ross, including a version of Busta Rhymes' "I Know What You Want". Their most successful album was Sjåre brymæ in 2004 that reached number 3 on VG-lista, the official Norwegian Albums Chart. In 2005, OnklP and Jaa9 won the Alarmprisen award for "Best Hip Hop Album" for their album Sjåre Brymæ.

What added to the popularity of the duo was that the up-and-coming Norwegian rappers contacted Dag Spantell most popular in the 1970s, offering to make a new version of his Spantell's 1973-hit "Kjendisparty". The new version became a true national breakthrough for the young rappers and one of the most played songs of 2004. Spantell himself made several concert appearances with them. The single made it to number 2 in the VG-lista singles chart making it the duo's highest scoring hit.

After the independent mixtape Bondedramatikk – En Gateplate, in 2008, they were signed to Sony Music and released the album Sellout! in 2009, and the single "Glir Forbi" taken from the album.

During the 2011 MTV Europe Music Awards, the duo was nominated in the Final 5 for MTV Best Norwegian Act. But the award went to Eva & The Heartmaker.

In later years OnklP has been the vocalist of a rap-rockband named OnklP & De Fjerne Slektningene (The Distant Relatives). Both their albums received massive appraise.

Members

Jaa9
Johnny Engdal Silseth (born in Valsøyfjord on 2 March 1982), best known by his stage name Jaa9 is a Norwegian rapper.

OnklP
Pål Tøien (born in Lillehammer on 12 May 1984), best known by his stage name OnklP is a Norwegian rapper. Besides his partnership in Jaa9 & OnklP, he released his own solo album Det kunne vært deg on Pass It record label.

He has cooperated with other artists as well, notably with Oslo Ess in Fritt Fram in 2012 and in 2014 returned with an album Onklp & De fjerne slektningene.

Discography: Jaa9 & OnklP

Albums and EPs
As Jaa9 & OnklP

Mixtapes and other releases
2003: Quest Vol. 1
2003: Bondegrammatikk – The Mixtape
2008: Bondedramatikk – En Gateplate

Singles

Appearances
2004: Dirty Oppland - Greatest Hits''

Discography: OnklP

Albums
Solo albums

as Onklp & De fjerne slektningene

Singles
as Onklp & De fjerne slektningene

References

Norwegian rappers
Musicians from Lillehammer